Kompressor was a parody industrial hip hop act (2000-2005) performed by "Andreas K.", a stagename of webcomic artist Drew Fairweather from Washington Court House, Ohio, United States.

Kompressor was originally anonymous but later revealed himself to be Drew, the author of the Toothpaste For Dinner daily webcomic and blog.

Kompressor's music is self-described as: "Kompressor sound is hard and angry, good words used for song and electronic."

History and persona

Kompressor began in 2000, when Drew began recording songs under the Kompressor name and putting songs, and videos of the songs, up for free download. The songs became popular over the ensuing years, leading to four albums.

Kompressor is depicted in his albums and videos wearing a strange alien mask, usually with a black leather jacket and black gloves. He proclaims to be from Bremen, Germany, to speak English as a second language, and some of his songs are in German, or have some German lyrics.

Kompressor released a cover of the "Tunak Tunak Tun" song by Sikh bhangra singer Daler Mehndi. In Kompressor's version, the lyrics open with "Kompressor crushing American people, Kompressor driving cars into stores, Kompressor crushing all of Manhattan, Kompressor flying plane into building". The song was recorded before the September 11, 2001 attacks, in which terrorists flew planes into the Twin Towers of the World Trade Center in lower Manhattan. After the attack, Kompressor replaced those two lines of the song in the web-released video, splicing in an old man playing "It's a Small World After All" on a piano.

Albums
Kompressormusik (1998)
World Domination (2001)

Crush Television (2002)

Underground Archives (2003)
Discipline (2004)

Discipline Remix CD (2005)
This two-CD set is the final release by Kompressor. It set contains 52 royalty-free audio tracks, which contain all sounds from Discipline and many World Domination and Crush Television sounds, including drums, synthesizers, vocoder, vocals, and processed/acoustic sounds. The CDs also contain 9 tracks of out-takes, unused synthesizer and drum tracks, and fragments of never-heard b-sides from Discipline.

Public domain
According to Sharing Machine, Kompressor's record label, while the music is copyrighted, all existing Kompressor lyrics are available in the public domain. Kompressor has also stated that his music is free to distribute, as long as it is not sold or used for commercial use.

Kompressor Singularity
Kompressor, who announced his intentions to revamp his project at the start of 2006, closed his online store at the end of 2005. Prior to closing the online store, he released all songs from World Domination and Crush Television (plus some songs from Underground Archives) for free download.

As of January 1, 2006, Kompressor's Singularity occurred. While not explicitly stating all music production will cease, his statement on the matter indicates that he will no longer sell music, and he would be selling off his music equipment. Additionally, the old Kompressor web site is replaced with a discography, yet other pages still exist on the server.

Sometime in late 2008 the Kompressor website was redirected to another website run by Drew, Superpoop. Drew was quoted as saying "You can buy Kompressor MP3s at amazon (drm-free) and there's no need to keep the old site online, so there you have it."

References

External links
Kompressor's LiveJournal
Toothpaste For Dinner webcomic and blog
Superpoop: His latest project, comedy image macro site
Kompressor Interview At Synthtopia

1979 births
Living people
American electronic musicians